Ahmed Ben Said Djaffar is a politician in the Comoros. He is the current foreign minister under Ahmed Abdallah Mohamed Sambi since Sambi's inauguration on 28 May 2006.

References

Year of birth missing (living people)
Living people
Comorian politicians
Government ministers of the Comoros